Deux Hot Dogs Moutarde Chou is the first full-length album by the band Les Georges Leningrad. It was originally released in 2002 on the band's own Les Records Coco Cognac label. In 2003, Blow The Fuse Records reissued the album. Upon signing with Alien8 Recordings in 2004, the band re-reissued the album on May 11 to mark time for their then upcoming second album.

Track listing
 "Caamckne Nechn" - 3:28
 "Lollipop Lady" - 3:32
 "Bad Smell" - 3:06
 "Georges V" - 4:11
 "La Chienne" - 2:53
 "Didi Extra" - 3:46
 "Prince R." - 1:04
 "Wunderkind" - 2:01
 "Un Imperméable (Mouillé des Deux Côtés) - 3:01
 "Cocktail Vampire" - 5:13
 "Constantinople (The Residents)" - 1:16
 "My Santropic" - 4:22
 "We are All" - 11:17

References

External links
Les Georges Leningrad official website
Alien8 Recordings
Deux Hot Dogs Moutarde Chou at Amazon.com

2002 albums
2003 albums
2004 albums
Les Georges Leningrad albums
Alien8 Recordings albums
Blow The Fuse Records albums